Hasan Enver Pasha, (b. 1857 at Istanbul, d. 1929 at Istanbul) was an Ottoman general. He was the son of Mustafa Celalettin Pasha a Polish convert to Islam, and the daughter of Omer Pasha. Besides he was an avid defender of the belonging of the Turkish race to the European white races. He married Leyla Hanım, a daughter of Mehmed Ali Pasha (marshal). They had five children: Celile who became the mother of Nâzım Hikmet, Münevver who became the mother of Oktay Rıfat Horozcu, Mustafa Celalettin, Mehmet Ali, and Sara.

In 1901, he led an expedition to deliver Islamic and pan-Islamic messages to the Muslims of China.

References

1857 births
1929 deaths
Pashas
19th-century Ottoman military personnel